Oirschot  (Orskot in the local dialect) is a municipality and a town in the southern Netherlands.

Population centres

Sights 
There are more than 300 monuments in the municipality Oirschot.

Some of the monuments are:
 The Roman Catholic Church named Sint-Petrus’-Bandenkerk. This 15th- and 16th-century Gothic church is the biggest building in the town of Oirschot and the tower of the church is 73 meters high. 
 The old town hall built in 1513 in the centre of town (Oirschot)
 Maria-church (Maria-kerk).  A 12th-century Romanesque church in the centre of the town of Oirschot. 
 Monastery Nazareth (Klooster Nazareth) with a chapel in Neoromanesque style (1910).
 Former Brewery De Kroon (Brouwerij de Kroon) built in 1773
 Hof van Solms, palace of Arnoldus Feij (or Arnold Fey)
 The Big Chair (De Grote Stoel) the biggest chair of Europe
 Huize Groenenberg, a house built in 1613

Some of the monuments outside of the town are:
 Chapel of the Holy Oak (Kapel van de Heilige Eik), stone chapel dated to 1854 built on the foundations of a stone chapel of 1606 (there was another stone chapel and a wooden chapel on the same location before the one of 1606). The chapel of 1606 was demolished by order of the States General in 1649 (Catholicism could not be practiced openly)
 The Old Tower (Oude Toren) of Oostelbeers, a church tower of the 14th century in a patch of forest surrounded by fields
 The Old Church of Middelbeers (Het Oude Kerkje - Oude Sint-Willibrorduskerk) - intact gothic rural church (15th century) typical for the region
 Maria Chapel (Mariakapel) of Westelbeers - chapel dating to 1637; it is a mystery why this chapel was not demolished during the 1640s or 1650s like nearly all other Catholic chapels in the region were

Events

 Zinderend Oirschot 
 Countery & Western weekend

There are many more festivals in Oirschot every year.

Politics

City Council 
The municipal elections in March 2018 resulted in the following make-up of the City Council (17 seats in total):

 CDA: 4 seats
 De Gewone Man (local party): 4 seats
 Dorpsvisie (local party): 3 seats
 Sociaal Progressief Oirschot (local party): 3 seats
 VVD: 2 seats
 D66: 1 seats

The old 2014 coalition that was governing Oirschot was formed out of 4 parties: CDA, Socialist Party, Dorpsvisie and PvdA.

Mayor 
The mayor of the municipality Oirschot is named Judith Keijzers-Verschelling.  She is member of the political party CDA.

Notable people 
 Arnold Fey, (Dutch Wiki) (born 1633 in Oirschot - 1679) a Dutch doctor.
 Frans van Lith (born 1863 in Oirschot - 1926) a Jesuit priest in Central Java
 Cornelius Van de Ven (1865 in Oirschot – 1932) Bishop of the Roman Catholic Diocese of Alexandria in Louisiana
 Carl Romme (1896 in Oirschot – 1980) a Dutch politician 
 Michiel van Kempen (born 1957 in Oirschot) a Dutch writer, art historian and literary critic
 Anita Smits (born 1967 in Oirschot) a former archer who competed at the 1988 Summer Olympics
 Truus Smulders-Beliën (1902–1966), first female mayor in the Netherlands
 Sophie van Gestel (born 1991 in Oostelbeers) a Dutch beach volleyball player, participated in the 2012 Summer Olympics

Gallery

References

External links

Official website

 
Municipalities of North Brabant
Populated places in North Brabant